Moza can refer to:
in biblical context
a son of Caleb
a descendant of Saul
ancient Motza or modern Motza, near Jerusalem
the river Meuse in western Europe

See also 

 Mosa (disambiguation)
 Mozza (disambiguation)